Bilad al-Wafi is a sub-district located in the Jabal Habashi District, Taiz Governorate, Yemen. Bilad al-Wafi had a population of 19,507 according to the 2004 census.

References 

Sub-districts in Jabal Habashi District